Guatemalteca is a genus of beetle in the family Carabidae. , its only described species is its type species, Guatemalteca virgen. When Terry Erwin named the genus in 2004, he placed it in the tribe Lachnophorini; in 2014 he and Laura S. Zamorano placed it in the subtribe Eucaerina.

In 2014, Erwin and Zamorano wrote that there were two additional undescribed species in this genus represented in the NMNH collection.

The genus's distribution includes cloud forests from Mexico to Peru, including Costa Rica, Guatemala, French Guiana, Mexico, and Peru.

References

Lebiinae
Monotypic Carabidae genera
Taxa named by Terry Erwin
Beetles of North America
Beetles of Central America
Beetles of South America